The 31st New Zealand Parliament was a term of the New Zealand Parliament. It was elected at the 1954 general election on 13 November of that year.

1954 general election

The 1954 general election was held on Saturday, 13 November.

Sessions
The 31st Parliament sat for three sessions, and was prorogued on 25 October 1957.

Ministries
Holland was succeeded by Keith Holyoake, but the Labour Party narrowly defeated National at the 1957 election, and the government changed in mid-December of that year.

Overview of seats
The table below shows the number of MPs in each party following the 1954 election and at dissolution:

Notes
The Working Government majority is calculated as all Government MPs less all other parties.

Initial composition of the 31st Parliament

By-elections during 31st Parliament
There were a number of changes during the term of the 31st Parliament.

Notes

References
 

31